Prawn rougaille is a Mauritian dish which is usually cooked with king prawns in a rougaille sauce.

Method 
Firstly, a tomato-based sauce called rougaille is prepared. This is a Creole sauce. Prawns are added to the sauce and cooked only for a few minutes to prevent overheating.

See also 
 Cuisine of Mauritius
 List of shrimp dishes

References 

Mauritian cuisine
Shrimp dishes